The 2009–10 season was Deportivo de La Coruña's 39th season in La Liga, the top division of Spanish football. The season covered the period 1 July 2009 to 30 June 2010.

Players

Squad
Retrieved on 22 March 2021

Out on loan

Transfers

In

Out

Squad stats 
Last updated on 7 December 2020.

|-
|colspan="14"|Players who have left the club after the start of the season:

|}

Season results

Pre-season

La Liga

League table

Positions by round

Matches

Copa del Rey

Round of 32

Deportivo La Coruña won 1–0 on aggregate

Round of 16

Deportivo La Coruña won 4–3 on aggregate

Quarter-finals

Sevilla won 3–1 on aggregate

Coaching staff

See also
2009–10 La Liga
2009–10 Copa del Rey

References

External links 
  
Unofficial Spanish fansite 
Another unofficial Spanish fansite 
Official international website
Official international forum
Polish site 
Unofficial arabic fansite
Unofficial Turkey Fan
Unofficial Russian Fan

Deportivo de La Coruna
Deportivo de La Coruña seasons